Jack Foster may refer to:
Jack Foster (athlete) (1932–2004), England-born New Zealand long-distance runner
Jack Foster (Australian footballer) (1912–1995), Australian footballer for Melbourne
Jack Foster (footballer, born 1877) (1877–1946), English footballer
Jack Foster (cricketer) (1905–1976), English cricketer
Jack Foster (journalist) (1906–1978), American journalist
Jack Foster (Neighbours), fictional character on the Australian soap opera Neighbours
Jack Foster III from Trent Gardner
Jack Foster (film maker) (born 1982), Scottish filmmaker
Jack Foster, Youngest bravery medal recipient in Australia

See also
John Foster (disambiguation)
Jack Forster (born 1987), rugby player